Ljeskovik may refer to:

 Ljeskovik (Goražde)
 Ljeskovik (Srebrenica)